This is a list of active and extinct volcanoes in Myanmar (also known as Burma).

Volcanoes

See also

References

Myanmar
 
Volcanoes